Kofo is a Nigerian given name. Notable people with the name include:

Kofo Abayomi (1896–1979), Nigerian ophthalmologist and politician
Kofo Akinkugbe, Nigerian technology entrepreneur
Kofoworola "Kofo" Omogoriola Olanipekun, a fictional character on the U.S. TV series Bob Hearts Abishola

See also
KOFO, a radio station from Ottawa, Kansas, United States

African given names